Zambia Cricket Union is the official governing body of the sport of cricket in Zambia. Its current headquarters is in Lusaka, Zambia. Zambia Cricket Union is Zambia's representative at the International Cricket Council, is an associate member, and has been a member of that body since 2003. It is also a member of the African Cricket Association. The union administers the Zambia national cricket team.

In July 2019, the International Cricket Council (ICC) suspended ZCA, with the team barred from taking part in ICC events.
In 2021 Zambia was expelled from ICC after failing to amend its breach

References

External links
Cric info-Zambia
 Zambia National Cricket Team

Cricket in Zambia